The 2005 Malé League was the fifth season of the Malé League. Top 6 teams qualify for the 2005 Dhivehi League while bottom 2 teams were relegated to the 2006 Second Division.

League table

References
 Maldives 2005, Malé League at RSSSF

Maldives

Football leagues in the Maldives
Maldives
1